The Martyrdom of Saint Sebastian is a drawing by Leonardo da Vinci showing the martyrdom of Saint Sebastian. It was rediscovered in Paris in March 2016, classed as a "trésor national" and presented to the press on 10 January 2017. Its auction estimate was 15,000,000 Euros and initially it was placed under an export ban in June 2017 to give French museums 30 months to raise sufficient funds to buy it.

External links
https://www.nytimes.com/2016/12/11/arts/design/leonardo-da-vinci-lost-drawing-discovered.html

Drawings by Leonardo da Vinci
Saint Sebastian in art
Torture in art